Cherry Elizabeth Vann  (born 29 October 1958) is a British Anglican bishop serving as Bishop of Monmouth in the Church in Wales. She previously served as Archdeacon of Rochdale from 2008 to 2020, having served all of her ordained ministry with the Church of England in the Diocese of Manchester.

Early life and education
Vann was born on 29 October 1958 in Whetstone, Leicestershire, England. She studied piano and violin at the Royal College of Music, becoming an Associate of the Royal College of Music (ARCM) diploma in 1978 and a Graduate of the Royal Schools of Music (GRSM) diploma in 1980. The GRSM is a diploma that may be regarded as a pass degree for the purpose of teacher training.

In 1986, Vann entered Westcott House, Cambridge, an Anglican theological college. There, she studied theology and undertook training in preparation of ordination for the next three years.

Ordained ministry
Vann was ordained in the Church of England as a deacon in 1989. She served as parish deacon at St Michael's Church, Flixton from 1989 to 1992 and at St Peter's Church, Bolton from 1992 to 1994. She was ordained as a priest in 1994; this was the first year that women were ordained to the priesthood in the Church of England. From 1994 to 1998, she was an assistant curate at St Peter's Church, Bolton. Additionally, she served as a chaplain at the Bolton Institute of Higher Education between 1992 and 1998.

From 1998 to 2004, Vann was Team Vicar of the East Farnworth and Kearsley Team Ministry. She was additionally a Chaplain for Deaf People between 1998 and 2004. She was then the incumbent of the Team Ministry, serving as Team Rector from 2004 to 2008. She also served as Area Dean of Farnworth between 2005 and 2008. In 2007, she was made an honorary canon of Manchester Cathedral.

In May 2008, Venn was announced as the next Archdeacon of Rochdale. In September 2008, she took up the appointment, having been installed as Archdeacon of Rochdale during a service at Manchester Cathedral. She was the first woman to become a senior priest (either an archdeacon or a dean) in the Diocese of Manchester.

In February 2013, Vann was elected Prolocutor of the Lower House of the Convocation of York. As such, she was also an ex-officio member of the Archbishops' Council. In January 2016, she was re-elected, having stood unopposed.

Episcopal ministry
On 19 September 2019, Vann was elected the next Bishop of Monmouth in the Church in Wales. She was bishop-elect until her election as diocesan bishop was confirmed by the Bench of Bishops at a Sacred Synod on 5 January 2020 (by which she legally took possession of the See); she was then consecrated as a bishop at Brecon Cathedral on 25 January and was enthroned as the 11th Bishop of Monmouth at Newport Cathedral on 1 February 2020.

Since 2021, Vann is a patron of the Open Table Network, an ecumenical Christian community for LGBT people and their allies.

Personal life 
Vann lives with her civil partner, Wendy. The Church in Wales allows clergy to be in same-sex civil partnerships.

References

1958 births
People educated at Lutterworth College
Alumni of Westcott House, Cambridge
Archdeacons of Rochdale
Archdeacons of Manchester
LGBT Anglican clergy
Living people
Associates of the Royal College of Music
Bishops of Monmouth
Women Anglican bishops
LGBT and Anglicanism
LGBT Anglican bishops
21st-century English LGBT people